Anne-Sophie Pelletier (born 5 February 1976) is a French politician who was elected as a Member of the European Parliament in 2019.

References

1976 births
Living people
La France Insoumise MEPs
MEPs for France 2019–2024
21st-century women MEPs for France
Politicians from Besançon